Rachis comorensis is an extinct species of air-breathing land snail, a terrestrial pulmonate gastropod mollusk in the superfamily Enoidea. This species was endemic to Mayotte, an island in the Indian Ocean.

References

comorensis
Extinct gastropods
Extinct animals of Africa
Fauna of Mayotte
Molluscs of Africa
Taxonomy articles created by Polbot
Endemic fauna of Mayotte